Margaret O'Brien (born November 20, 1973) is a former member of the Michigan Senate and the Michigan House of Representatives. A member of the Republican Party, she represented a district based in Kalamazoo.

Early life 
O'Brien was born in Kalamazoo County to Richard and Katheleen (Crawford) Wilson. Her childhood was spent on dairy farms with her three brothers, first in Pavilion Township and then in Texas Township.

She attended Fulton and Indian Lake Elementary Schools in Vicksburg and graduated in 1991 from Mattawan High School, where she excelled in track and field and cross country. The women's track record for the 3200-meter relay, set in 1991, is still held by O'Brien and her teammates. She earned a bachelor's degree in international relations from James Madison College at Michigan State University.

From 1995–2003, O'Brien was a social worker with Catholic Family Services. She then worked as a real estate agent at RE/MAX and served on the City Council of Portage, Michigan, from 2003–2010. She lives in Portage with her husband and four children.

Political career 
O'Brien was first elected to the Michigan House in 2010 and became active on private property rights, education reform, adoption, and direct access to physical therapy. She was twice unanimously elected as associate speaker pro tem and often presided over sessions of the House.

In 2014, she was elected to represent the 20th district in the Michigan Senate, defeating Democratic nominee Sean McCann and Libertarian nominee Lorence Wenke. In the Senate, she was unanimously elected as assistant president pro tem and again frequently presided over sessions. She worked on bills to ensure the rights of people with service animals, to provide state IDs to the homeless, to protect victims of domestic violence, to enact safe passing distances for vulnerable roadway users, and to train caregivers of seniors and people with disabilities.

O'Brien is known for her work to change Michigan's sexual assault laws in the aftermath of the Larry Nassar scandal, alongside advocates including Rachael Denhollander, Aly Raisman, Amanda Thomashow, Sterling Reithman, and Larissa Boyce.

In 2018, she lost a rematch with McCann. In January 2019, she was elected as secretary of the Michigan Senate, only the second woman to have held that post.

References

External links
State House bio of O'Brien
Vote Smart profile of O'Brien

1973 births
Living people
Republican Party members of the Michigan House of Representatives
Michigan State University alumni
People from Portage, Michigan
Republican Party Michigan state senators
Women state legislators in Michigan
21st-century American politicians
21st-century American women politicians